Milos is one of the regional units of Greece. It is part of the region of South Aegean. The regional unit covers the islands of Kimolos, Milos, Serifos, Sifnos and several smaller islands in the Aegean Sea.

Administration

As a part of the 2011 Kallikratis government reform, the Milos regional unit was created out of part of the former Cyclades Prefecture. It is subdivided into 4 municipalities. These are (number as in the map in the infobox):

Kimolos (9)
Milos (11)
Serifos (15)
Sifnos (17)

Province
The province of Milos was one of the provinces of the Cyclades Prefecture. It had the same territory as the present regional unit. It was abolished in 2006.

References

 
Regional units of the South Aegean
2011 establishments in Greece
Provinces of Greece